Lakka is a coastal resort town around the peninsular in the Western Area Rural District of Sierra Leone. The town lies about ten miles west of Freetown. The major industry in Lakka town is tourism and fishing. Lakka is known for its large beaches, which attract tourists to the town. Lakka has an estimated population of about 4,500, which is a small town by population, though large in land area.

Demographics
Lakka town is ethnically diverse, as it is inhabited by several ethnic groups, though the Sherbro and Krio people are the principal inhabitants of the town. The inhabitants of Lakka are mainly fishermen. Lakka town is home to its own hospital, a number of hotels, as well as several primary schools and a secondary school. The inhabitant of Lakka are largely Christian.

Politics
Although part of the Western Area Rural district council, Lakka has its own directly elected local town council headed by a Town Head. The current Town Head of Lakka is Foday Tucker, who was elected in the 2013 Lakka district head municipal election .

References

External links

Lakka on ecosaleone.com
Standard Time Press

Western Area
Populated places in Sierra Leone